Jopet Show is a Finnish sketch show starring comedian Jope Ruonansuu, Mika Räinä & Jukka Toivonen.

Sketches (Season 1)
Puhuva Pää (A Talking Head)
Aulis Gerlander
Keksijä (An inventor)
Ylilääkäri Irvi Tapani Kaikkonen (Doctorate Irvi Tapani Kaikkonen)
Armeijan eversti (A Colonel in the Army)
Sivupersoonamies Risto (Risto the man with other self)
Ennustaja Tollo Peloton (The Future Teller Tollo Peloton)
Kitaransoittaja/säveltäjä (A Guitar-player/composer)
Pizza-Peku (A Turkish man who owns a pizzeria)
Dilledong! (Dilledong, a parody of a Finnish interactive TV-show Ring-A-Ling)
Lehteä lukeva ruma tyttö (An Ugly Little Girl Reading a Magazine)
Lentokapteeni Saikkonen (Captain Saikkonen)
Pepe Puputti, kirjailija Kiuruvedeltä (Pepe Puputti, An author from Kiuruvesi)
Virolainen radioasema (An Estonian Radiostation)
Kansantaloustieteen erikoistutkija Tenho Lepakko ohjelmassa Tietovuoto (The Economics special researcher Tenho Lepakko In the Show Tietovuoto).
Miehet hississä (Two Men In A Lift)

Sketches (Season 2)
Homopoliisit (Two Homosexual Police officers)
Chatjuontajat (The Chat Speakers)
Uutistenlukija (The Newscaster, he always say Tä? (In English huh?)
Remu Aaltonen
Psykiatri (Psychiatrist)
Maksastapuhuja (The Liver-Ventriloquist)
Käytettyjen autojen myyjä (Used Cars Seller)
Mainostentekijät (The Advertisers)
Vissymies (The Man Drinking Vichy-water)
Teinit (Children in Teen Age)

Sketches (Season 3)
Yeltsin (Yeltsin is a little insane Russian living at a gravel quarry next to a nuclear power plant who talks a lot but whose speech can no-one understand. Slides some Finnish words in the middle of his speech.)

External links
 

Finnish television sketch shows